Glenn Greenberg (born New York City) is an American journalist and comic book and fiction writer. At the beginning of his career, he became a regular Marvel Comics writer, penning stories for The Spectacular Spider-Man, The Rampaging Hulk, The Silver Surfer, and Dracula. He has also written articles for comic-related magazines such as Back Issue!.

After establishing himself in the comic book industry, he was hired to write the Star Trek: Untold Voyages comic book limited series which depicted a second five-year mission for Captain Kirk's Enterprise and became a fan favorite. Since then, Greenberg has written several books in the Star Trek universe, a screenplay, and an X-Files story for a fiction anthology collection. 

As a journalist, Greenberg has written for such publications as Entertainment Weekly, People, and Time for Kids, and written nonfiction special-edition magazines for Time Life Books, Time, and other publishers about topics including John Lennon, Star Trek, Marvel, Indiana Jones, and Spider-Man.

References

External links
 Radio interview, Destinies: The Voice of Science Fiction (WUSB- FM, State University of New York at Stony Brook, January 17, 2014)

 Glenn Greenberg personal page

Year of birth missing (living people) 
American comics writers
Living people